Ronelle Marshall Hallin (born January 2, 1938) is an American television producer and actress, and sister of Penny Marshall and Garry Marshall. She is best known for her work on the television shows Happy Days, Mork & Mindy, and Step by Step.

Filmography

Television

As producer
Blansky's Beauties (1976–1979)
Happy Days (1977–1984)
Mork & Mindy (1978–1982)
Laverne & Shirley (1979)
Joanie Loves Chachi (1981–1983)
You Again? (1985–1987)
Valerie (1985–1991)
Nothing in Common (1986–1987)
Family Matters (1989–1990)
Perfect Strangers (1989–1992)
Going Places (1990–1991)
Step by Step (1991–1992)

As actress
The Odd Couple (1974)
Laverne & Shirley (1982)

Film

As actress
Herndon (1982)
Frankie and Johnny (1991)
Exit to Eden (1994)
Raising Helen (2004)

References

External links

1938 births
Living people
Actresses from New York City
American television producers
American television actresses
21st-century American women